is the 21st single by Japanese entertainer Akina Nakamori. Written by Yuri Moriko and Anri Sekine, the single was released on May 18, 1988, by Warner Pioneer through the Reprise label. It was also the fifth single from her fourth compilation album Best II.

Background 
"Tattoo" was used by Orient Watch Co. for their "Orient Clock You" commercial featuring Nakamori.

Nakamori has re-recorded "Tattoo" for the 1995 compilation True Album Akina 95 Best and the 2002 self-cover compilation Utahime Double Decade.

Chart performance 
"Tattoo" became Nakamori's 19th No. 1 on Oricon's weekly singles chart and sold over 296,800 copies.

Track listing

Charts

References

External links 
 
 
 

1988 singles
1988 songs
Akina Nakamori songs
Japanese-language songs
Warner Music Japan singles
Reprise Records singles
Oricon Weekly number-one singles